Something Wonderful may refer to:

 "Something Wonderful" (song), a show tune from the Rodgers and Hammerstein musical The King and I
 Something Wonderful (album), a 1960 album by Nancy Wilson
 Something Wonderful, a 1996 album by Bryn Terfel
 Something Wonderful, a novel by Judith McNaught
 "Something Wonderful", a song on the Revolting Cocks album Beers, Steers, and Queers